Guatemala is a predominantly Christian country, with Islam being a small minority religion. Due to secular nature of the Guatemala's constitution, Muslims are free to proselytize and build places of worship in the country.

The Muslim population of Guatemala is approximately 1,200 (0.008% of the total population), of which 95% are Palestinian immigrants. There is a mosque near the emblematic Reforma avenue, called the Islamic Da'wah Mosque of Guatemala (Spanish: Mezquita de Aldawaa Islámica) which is available for the five daily prayers and offers classes in Islamic studies.

The president of the Islamic Community of the country is Fahed Himeda el-Sagini.

The main Ahmadiyya mosque in the country is Mezquita Baitul Awwal, first constructed in 1989. However, the Community also has mosques in Huehuetenango and Quetzaltenango. There are about 700 Ahmadis in the country.

References

External links
Mezquita Aldawa Guatemala